The 1985–86 NBA season was the Spurs' tenth season in the NBA, the 13th in San Antonio, and the 19th season as a franchise. It was also their first season without George Gervin, who played with the team since 1974 as he was traded to the Chicago Bulls during the offseason.

In his second year, Alvin Robertson led the league in steals and made his first All-Star Game appearance. Robertson earned Defensive Player of the year honors at the end of the season.

Draft picks

Roster

Regular season

Season standings

z - clinched division title
y - clinched division title
x - clinched playoff spot

Record vs. opponents

Game log

Regular season

Playoffs

|- align="center" bgcolor="#ffcccc"
| 1
| April 17
| @ L.A. Lakers
| L 88–135
| Mike Mitchell (24)
| Mitchell, Johnson (4)
| Wes Matthews (10)
| The Forum17,505
| 0–1
|- align="center" bgcolor="#ffcccc"
| 2
| April 19
| @ L.A. Lakers
| L 94–122
| Wes Matthews (30)
| David Greenwood (7)
| Alvin Robertson (8)
| The Forum17,505
| 0–2
|- align="center" bgcolor="#ffcccc"
| 3
| April 23
| L.A. Lakers
| L 94–114
| Wes Matthews (30)
| Artis Gilmore (11)
| Wes Matthews (8)
| HemisFair Arena7,918
| 0–3

Player statistics

Season

Playoffs

Awards and records
Alvin Robertson, NBA Most Improved Player Award
Alvin Robertson, All-NBA Second Team
Alvin Robertson, NBA All-Defensive Second Team

Transactions

References

See also
1985-86 NBA season

San Antonio Spurs seasons
San Antonio
San Antonio
San Antonio